A lily pad is the leaf of flowering plants of the Nymphaeaceae family, commonly called water lilies.

Lily pad may also refer to:
 Lily pads, a name for the Cooperative Security Location of U.S. worldwide military facilities
 A lily pad network for wireless networking

Lilypad may refer to:
 LilyPad, an Arduino microcontroller board
 The Lilypad, a name for the Floating ecopolis a design for amphibious cities
 Lilypad begonia, a plant with scientific name Begonia nelumbiifolia
 LilyPad, the former, now discontinued built-in score editor for LilyPond music engraving on macOS and Windows